Peter or Pete Rose may refer to:

Sportspeople
Pete Rose (born 1941), American former baseball player and manager
Pete Rose Jr. (born 1969), American baseball player

Other people
Peter Rose (author) (born 1939), American author and food historian
Pete Rose (musician) (born 1942), American musician
Peter Rose (architect) (born 1943), designer of the Canadian Centre for Architecture
Peter Rose (poet) (born 1955), Australian poet
Peter Rose, British music writer

Other
Pete Rose Baseball, a video game for the Atari 2600

See also
Peter DeRose (1900–1953), composer of jazz and pop music during the Tin Pan Alley era
Peter Roes (born 1964), Belgian racing cyclist